The South Fork Coquille River is the longest tributary of the Coquille River in coastal Oregon in the United States. From its headwaters in the Southern Oregon Coast Range, the river flows northwest to join the North Fork Coquille River at Myrtle Point, forming the main stem Coquille.

Course
Picking up scores of tributaries, such as Wooden Rock, Clear and Panther Creeks, the river gains volume as it flows southwest into a deep gorge. At the confluence with Rock Creek, the river abruptly swings north, receiving Johnson Creek from the left a few miles further downstream. Now a fairly large stream, the South Fork winds through canyons to the confluence with Coal Creek before entering an alluvial valley near the small community of Powers.

Below the city, the South Fork flows north through a canyon into another broad valley, now followed by Oregon Route 542, and passing Coquille Myrtle Grove State Natural Site and Albert H. Powers Memorial State Park. About a mile downstream, Dement Creek enters from the left and the terrain around the river transforms from hills to farmland. As it assumes a meandering course, the river passes Broadbent, then the Middle Fork Coquille River, by far the largest tributary, enters from the right, marking the head of tide.

The South Fork Coquille River has two major waterfalls, situated in a steep and remote canyon just upstream of the first major northward bend of its course. These are the  Upper Coquille River Falls, and the much larger  Coquille River Falls.

Watershed
The watershed is sparsely populated, with most of the people concentrated in the towns of Powers and Myrtle Point. Anadromous fish including salmon and steelhead inhabit much of the river, but some habitat has been compromised due to poor watershed management practices such as excessive logging and clearing.

See also
List of longest streams of Oregon
List of rivers of Oregon

References

External links
Coquille Watershed Association

Rivers of Oregon
Rivers of Coos County, Oregon